This page lists the winners and nominees for the British Academy Television Award for Best Male Comedy Performance, since its institution in 2009. 

The British Academy of Film and Television Arts (BAFTA), is a British organisation that hosts annual awards shows for film, television, children's film and television, and interactive media. 

Since 2009 (presented in 2010), there have been two separate comedy performance awards for Best Male Comedy Performance and Best Female Comedy Performance. Previously one award for Best Comedy Performance was presented. Steve Coogan has won the award three times, and Jamie Demetriou twice.

Winners and nominees

2010s

2020s

Superlatives

Actors with multiple wins and nominations

Multiple wins
3 wins
Steve Coogan
2 wins
Jamie Demetriou

Multiple nominations
The following people have been nominated for the British Academy Television Award for Best Male Comedy Performance multiple times:

4 nominations
Hugh Bonneville
Steve Coogan

3 nominations
Jamie Demetriou
Ncuti Gatwa
Tom Hollander
Brendan O'Carroll
2 nominations
Peter Capaldi
Asim Chaudhry
Joe Gilgun
Toby Jones
Samson Kayo
David Mitchell

Programmes with multiple wins and nominations

Multiple Nominations

3 nominations
Mrs. Brown's Boys
Rev.
Sex Education
Stath Lets Flats

2 nominations
Brassic
Detectorists
 Man Like Mobeen
People Just Do Nothing
The Inbetweeners
’’Inside No. 9’’
The IT Crowd
The Thick of It
The Wrong Mans
Twenty Twelve
W1A

References

External links
 BAFTA official site
 BAFTA Awards, Internet Movie Database

Male Comedy Performance